A complete list of  films produced in the country of Azerbaijan ordered by year of release and decade on separate pages:

1892-1919
List of Azerbaijani films before 1920

1920s
List of Azerbaijani films of the 1920s

1930s
List of Azerbaijani films of the 1930s

1940s
List of Azerbaijani films of the 1940s

1950s
List of Azerbaijani films of the 1950s

1960s
List of Azerbaijani films of the 1960s

1970s
List of Azerbaijani films of the 1970s

1980s
List of Azerbaijani films of the 1980s

1990s
List of Azerbaijani films of the 1990s

2000s
List of Azerbaijani films of the 2000s

2010s
List of Azerbaijani films of the 2010s

2020s
List of Azerbaijani films of the 2020s

External links
 Azerbaijani film at the Internet Movie Database
 Azerbaycan Kinosu